Katherine Florence Dotrice (née Newman; 9 May 1929 – 2 August 2007), known professionally as Kay Newman and Kay Dotrice, was a British stage and screen actress, best known for her roles in the UK TV series Crossroads, the movie Cheech & Chong's The Corsican Brothers, and many repertory performances during the 1950s.

Career
Dotrice began her career performing in revue and repertory theatre, particularly in the north of England. She played many lead roles, and consistently received positive notices. Reviewing J. Hartley Manners' Peg O' My Heart, one critic wrote "the Chichester family .. members were vividly contrasted [with] ... Kay Newman, fresh from her success as Emmy in "They Walk Alone", as the resentful Ethel", while another said, "Kay Newman, as the slandered wife, gave an appealing performance". Reviews of Mel Dinelli's The Man commented "Kay Newman in particular gave an impressive performance. As the frightened and tormented woman who unwittingly hires the services of a homicidal maniac as a house-help, she had a firm grasp on the part", and "Kay Newman reveals strong dramatic powers as in rapid succession she conveys nervous tension ranging from surprise to panic." In John Van Druten's Behold We Live, she "gives a delightful character study as a down-to-earth London housekeeper." In performances on Guernsey of Johnny Belinda, "the leading part of Belinda [was] a personal triumph for Kay Newman, who played it with charm and restraint."
In 1962, her six-year-old daughter Karen Dotrice was offered a five-year contract by Walt Disney, and Kay Dotrice spent all her time with her, supporting her and helping her learn her scripts. In 1977, she returned to performing under the name Kay Dotrice, playing the roles of Mrs Darling and Michael in a Decca recording of Peter Pan. The following year, she was cast as Mrs Crisp in the long-running ITV series Crossroads, and appeared in twenty-five episodes. In 1984, she appeared as the midwife in the film Cheech & Chong's The Corsican Brothers.

Selected stage performances (as Kay Newman)

Family
Kay Dotrice was the wife of actor Roy Dotrice. They lived for many years in Shipston-on-Stour, Warwickshire. Their daughters, Karen, Michele, and Yvette, have also been actresses.

References

External links
 

1929 births
2007 deaths
British film actresses
British stage actresses
British television actresses
Shakespearean actresses
21st-century British actresses
20th-century British actresses